Are You Shakespearienced? is the second studio album released by Minneapolis alternative rock band Trip Shakespeare. It was released in 1989 on Minneapolis indie label Gark Records, then reissued in 1998 on Minneapolis label Clean/Twin/Tone Records, and again in 2014 on Omnivore Recordings.

The album was the first to feature Dan Wilson, brother of founding member and main songwriter Matt Wilson, who had joined after the recording of Trip Shakespeare's debut, 1986's Applehead Man.

Recorded live in the studio without headsets, the album featured "Toolmaster of Brainerd," a song that "insanely links dairyland folklore with the enduring rock myth of guitar-hero supremacy." Hailing from "Brainerd where the children go to milking school," the Toolmaster

learned to play the Gibson that his dog had found
And he came to haunt the bars of Minneapolis town.

"Toolmaster," according to Minneapolis City Pages, "perfectly captured the tension between Minneapolis ambition and outstate resignation that pretty much informs life in the Land of 10,000 Lakes."

Reception
The album was well received by critics, and has grown over time to be considered by many fans perhaps the band's best album. Michael Toland of Blurt called the album an improvement over their debut, saying "the band expands its reach with more sophisticated and rock-oriented arrangements. The Tripsters make good use of their musicianly prowess with close interplay that avoids showboating, while Dan's addition gives the band extra vocal power." Timothy Monger of AllMusic said that "the ambitious harmonies and artful songwriting approach introduced on their 1986 debut Applehead Man became fully realized here ... They cast a captivating spell weaving tales that melded weird fantasy elements with a staunchly romantic regionalism." He also noted that several of the Shakespearienced songs became staples of the band's live shows for the rest of their career, such as the "riffy, harmony-stacked 'Reception' and the whimsical mini rock opera 'Toolmaster of Brainerd.'" Scott Schinder of Trouser Press wrote that the album "shows increased depth and a more distinctive musical voice." The Chicago Reader'''s Bill Wyman, who had disliked the band's debut Applehead Man, was more positive towards Are You Shakespearienced?'', calling it "the first example of the band's precipitous growth." But he also complained that "the production was about 20 years out of time" and that Matt Wilson's lyrics "seemed to be fast developing into an almost painful olio of Renaissance Faire flourishes, portentous apostrophes, and low-budget Keatsianisms."

Songs
 "Diane" - 3:06
 "The Lake" - 3:50
 "Swing" - 4:36
 "Two Wheeler, Four Wheeler" - 2:49
 "Spirit" - 4:00
 "Thief" - 3:25
 "Toolmaster of Brainerd" - 4:26
 "Vines" - 5:46
 "Reception" - 4:28

References

1989 albums
Trip Shakespeare albums
Twin/Tone Records albums
Omnivore Recordings albums